Spy is a British situation comedy created and written by Simeon Goulden. The first series aired on 14 October 2011 on Sky 1 in the UK, as well as on the online video service Hulu in the United States. A second series began airing on 19 October 2012, ending with a Christmas Special on 26 December 2012. On 1 March 2013, Darren Boyd announced that the show would not be returning for a third series.

Cast and characters
 Darren Boyd as Tim Elliot
 Jude Wright as Marcus Elliot: Tim's ten-and-a-half year-old son
 Robert Lindsay as The Examiner: Tim's boss
 Dolly Wells as Judith Elliot: Tim's ex-wife
 Tom Goodman-Hill (series 1) and Mark Heap (series 2) as Philip Quil: Judith's partner and Marcus's headteacher; the change of casting was addressed by Philip saying that he had changed his hairstyle
 Mathew Baynton as Chris Pitt-Goddard: Tim's friend and former colleague who is secretly a lawyer
 Rebekah Staton as Caitlin Banks: Tim's MI5 colleague
 Rosie Cavaliero as Paula Abdul: Marcus's first social worker who had a romantic obsession with Tim
 Ed Coleman as Moritz Skenk: Tim's hapless coworker
 Ellie Hopkins as Justine: Marcus's love interest
 Terence Maynard as Marion Portis: Caitlin's long-missing, assumed dead, fiancé
 Miles Jupp as Owen: Marcus's second social worker
 Frank Kauer as Nick Chin: Marcus's rival
 David K. S. Tse as David Chin: Nick's father
 Terence Maynard as Portis

Episode list

Series 1 (2011)

Series 2 (2012)

Christmas Special (2012)

Reception
Reception of the series has been varied. Olly Grant of The Telegraph described the new series as "a very promising little comedy, and [Robert] Lindsay is particularly good in it."
The premiere was described by Ben Arnold (The Guardian) as a "hopeful offering", but wrote, "It will need considerably more laughs in future episodes to stand repeat viewing." The series' second episode was termed "mediocre" by Catherine Gee (Telegraph), but Jack Seale (Radio Times) wrote "never mind that everyone's crazy and nothing is real, so that – like a lot of US sitcoms – you wouldn't mind missing an episode. When you're in front of it, Spy keeps doling out quick, cheap, satisfying laughs." In a 2011 year-end wrap-up, Julia Raeside (Guardian) wrote:

In 2012, Sam Wollaston (Guardian) described it as "totally ridiculous, but in a charming way" and having "a lovable silliness."

DVD release
The complete first series of Spy was released on DVD on 5 November 2012. The complete second series of Spy was released on DVD on 29 July 2013.

International remakes
An American version was being discussed to broadcast on ABC. ABC released casting info for the show, with Rob Corddry being cast as Tim, Mason Cook as Marcus, Paget Brewster in the new role of Erica as Marcus' mom and Tim's ex-wife, replacing Judith, Moshe Kasher as Chris, Camille Guaty as Caitlin, and Ken Jeong as The Examiner. Nat Faxon was to guest star in the pilot, and if the series was picked up, would have been a guest star in as many episodes as possible. The show was to be produced by ABC Studios and Hat Trick Productions, with Simeon Goulden, Jimmy Mulville and Helen Williams as executive producers. The series was to be written by Simeon Goulden as well, with Alex Hardcastle directing the pilot. On 10 May 2013, Deadline reported that ABC had passed on the pilot.

References

External links

2010s British sitcoms
2011 British television series debuts
2012 British television series endings
English-language television shows
Espionage television series
Sky sitcoms
Television series by Hat Trick Productions
MI5 in fiction